Anders Alftberg (born 21 January, 1973 in Jönköping) is a Swedish educator and politician of the Sweden Democrats party who has been a member of the Riksdag since 2022 representing the constituency of Västra Götaland County South.

Biography
Alftberg was born in Jönköping in 1973 before moving to Borås in the 1980s. He worked for sixteen years as a middle and high school teacher in Borås.

In 2018, he was elected as a municipal councilor for the Sweden Democrats in Borås and served as a political secretary to the SD's spokesman on the council. He also sat on the education board within the county. For the 2022 Swedish general election, Alftberg contested the constituency of Västra Götaland County South on the SD's ballot and won a seat. He is expected to take up seat 49 in the Riksdag.

Outside of politics, Alftberg is married with three children. He has cited former British Prime Minister Winston Churchill as a role model.

See also 

 List of members of the Riksdag, 2022–2026

References 

1973 births
Living people
Swedish educators
21st-century Swedish politicians
Members of the Riksdag from the Sweden Democrats
Members of the Riksdag 2022–2026